Wu Jingzi (Wu Ching-tzu), (1701—January 11, 1754) was a Qing dynasty Chinese scholar and writer who was born in the city now known as Quanjiao, Anhui and who died in Yangzhou, Jiangsu. He was the author of The Scholars, often seen as the foremost Chinese satiric novel.

Biography

Wu was born into a well-to-do family. His father Wu Linqi was a Qing official, but Wu Jingzi himself met with no success. He obtained the xiucai degree in 1720, but when people in Anhui criticized him for wasting his family fortune, he moved to Nanjing. Poverty-stricken by the age of thirty-two, he met and acquainted himself with many government officials but renounced ambition did not attempt the exams. One report had it that he could not afford to buy fuel, and when the nights were cold, he and his friends would walk together outside the city walls, chatting and composing poetry, a tactic they called 暖足 ("warming our feet"). 

Wu's family may have had ties to the famous philosophers Yan Yuan and Li Gong. The philosophers emphasized the importance of ritual in Neo-Confucianism and may have influenced Wu's novel.

While in Nanjing, in 1740, he started his famous novel The Scholars. There is a museum in his honor located in his hometown of Quanjiao county, now Chuzhou.

Notes

References
Encyclopædia Britannica 2005 Ultimate Reference Suite DVD, article- "Wu Ching-tzu"
 He, Manzi, "Rulin Waishi" ("The Scholars"). Encyclopedia of China, 1st ed.
 Paul S. Ropp, Dissent in Early Modern China: Ju-Lin Wai-Shih and Ch'ing Social Criticism (Ann Arbor: University of Michigan Press,  1981).
 . Archived at InternetArchive.

External links

 

1701 births
1754 deaths
People from Chuzhou
Qing dynasty novelists
Writers from Anhui
18th-century Chinese writers
Chinese male novelists